Tennessee's Pardner is a surviving 1916 American Western film directed by George Melford, written by Marion Fairfax, and starring Fannie Ward, Jack Dean, Charles Clary, Jessie Arnold, Ronald Bradbury, and Raymond Hatton. It was released February 6, 1916, by Paramount Pictures.

The film was based upon the 1869 Bret Harte story "Tennessee’s Pardner," which has also been filmed as The Flaming Forties (1924), The Golden Princess (1925), and Tennessee's Partner (1955).

Premise
Fannie Ward plays the part of a young girl whose parents are separated on their journey to California. When her father is killed, she is left in the care of her father's friend.

Cast 
 Fannie Ward as Tennessee
 Jack Dean as Jack Hunter
 Charles Clary as Tom Romaine
 Jessie Arnold as Kate Kent
 Ronald Bradbury as Bill Kent
 Raymond Hatton as Gewilliker Hay
 James Neill as The Padre

Preservation status
The film is preserved in the UCLA Film and Television Archive and/or The Library of Congress collection.

References

External links 
 

1916 films
1916 Western (genre) films
1910s English-language films
Paramount Pictures films
Films directed by George Melford
American black-and-white films
Silent American Western (genre) films
1910s American films